Dharmapāla (traditional Chinese: 護法,  pinyin: Hùfǎ) (530–561 CE). A Buddhist scholar, he was one of the main teachers of the Yogacara school in India. He was a contemporary of Bhavaviveka (清辯, c. 490-570 CE.), with whom he debated.

Xuanzang, the famous Chinese pilgrim, tells that Dharmapāla was born in Kanchipuram, Tamil Nadu. He was a son of a high official, and betrothed to a daughter of the king, but escaped on the eve of the wedding feast, entered the order, studied all views, from Hinayana as well as Mahayana, and attained to reverence and distinction. He studied in Nalanda as a student of Dignāga. Later he succeeded him as abbot of the University. He spent his last years near the Bodhi tree, where he died.

Dharmapāla developed the theory that the external things do not exist and consciousness only exists. He explains the manifestation of the phenomenal world as arising from the eight consciousness.

Through the teachings of his disciple Silabhadra to Xuanzang, Dharmapāla’s tenets expanded greatly in China. 

According to Chinese sources, Dharmapala wrote four works. One of these is a lost work on grammar. The other three, which only survive in Chinese, are the following commentaries:

 A Commentary on the Four-Hundred Verses (Dasheng guang bailun shilun 大乘廣百論 釋論; T1571, in 10 fascicles): a commentary on the Four-Hundred Verses (Catuḥśataka) of Āryadeva (c. third century).
 Jewel-Arising Treatise on the Establishment of Consciousness-Only (Cheng weishi baosheng lun 成唯識寶生論; T1591, in 5 fascicles), a commentary on Vasubandhu’s Twenty Verses (Viṃśikā).
 A Commentary on the Investigation of Cognitive Objects (Guan suoyuan lun shi 觀所緣 論釋; T1625, in 1 fascicle;), commentary on Dignāga’s Investigation of Cognitive Objects (Ālambanaparīkṣā).

References

Indian Buddhists
Indian scholars of Buddhism
6th-century Indian philosophers
Yogacara scholars
People from Kanchipuram district
Scholars from Tamil Nadu
6th-century Indian writers
Monks of Nalanda